Ferdinand, Duke of Genoa may refer to:
Prince Ferdinando, Duke of Genoa (1822–1855), founder of the Genoa branch of the House of Savoy
Prince Ferdinando, Duke of Genoa (1884–1963), third Duke of Genoa

See also
 Ferdinand (disambiguation)